Jamison is an unincorporated community in Fremont Township, Clarke County, Iowa, United States.

History
Founded in the 1800s, Jamison's population was 61 in 1902, and 65 in 1925.

References

Unincorporated communities in Clarke County, Iowa
Unincorporated communities in Iowa